The Lucky Transfer is a 1915 American short drama film directed by Tod Browning. It was Browning's debut film as a director.

Cast
 Mary Alden as Helen Holland
 Tom Wilson as Ford
 Thomas Hull as Ransom
 Vester Pegg as The clerk
 Margery Wilson as The little girl
 Jack Hull as Jim Dodson
 William Lowery as Fields, the detective
 Sydney Lewis Ransome (as Doc Ransome)
 William Hinckley (unconfirmed)

References

External links

1915 films
1915 short films
American silent short films
American black-and-white films
1915 drama films
Films directed by Tod Browning
1915 directorial debut films
Silent American drama films
1910s American films